Vedea is a commune in Teleorman County, Muntenia, Romania. It is composed of five villages: Albești, Coșoteni, Dulceanca, Meri and Vedea.

References

Communes in Teleorman County
Localities in Muntenia